The Lord Mayor of Kampala City is the honorary title of the chairperson of Kampala Capital City Authority which is the local government body for the city of Kampala, the capital of the Republic of Uganda. The incumbent, since 2011, is councilor Erias Lukwago.

History 

The office of Mayor of Kampala was created in 1950 by the government of the Protectorate of Uganda, and headed the Kampala City Council. In 1998, the mayor was elected directly for the first time. The office of Mayor was elevated to Lord Mayor in 2011 by the newly established Kampala Capital City Authority. Its role was reduced to a ceremonial one, with powers being transferred to the executive director, appointed by the President of Uganda, and the Minister for Kampala in the Cabinet.

Functions 
The office is largely symbolic and its responsibilities consist of chairing meetings of the city council and representing the city at public events. The Deputy Lord Mayor assists the Lord Mayor in the performance of his or her functions and otherwise deputise for the Lord Mayor in his or her absence.

List of mayors 

 Sir Amar Maini (1950–1955)
 K. H. Dale (1955–1956)
 C. Lewis (1956–1958)
 C. E. Develin (1958–1959)
 S. W. Kulubya (1959–1961)
 Barbara Saben (1961–1962)
 P. I. Patel (1962–1963)
 P. N. Kavuma (1961–1965)
 W. Y. Nega (1965–1968)
 A. G. Mehta (1968 – 10 March 1969)
 E. W. Nakibinge (1969-–1971)
 George Franck Walusimbi Mpanga (1971–1982)
 Fred Ssemaganda (1982–1986)
 Joseph Wasswa Ziritwawula (1987–1989)
 Christopher Iga (1989–1997)
 Nasser Sebaggala (1998–1999)
 John Ssebaana Kizito (1999–2006)
 Nasser Sebaggala (2006–2011)
 Erias Lukwago (2011–present)

See also 

 Lord Mayor
 List of cities and towns in Uganda

Notes

References

External links 
 Kampala Capital City Authority

Mayors of Kampala